Noam Okun (born 16 April 1978) is an Israeli retired professional tennis player.

He reached a career-high singles ranking of World No. 95 in April 2002. Okun won several challenger tournaments in his career, and was a consistent competitor on the ATP tour, often qualifying for Grand Slam events.

He, Harel Levy, and Dudi Sela were Israel's top singles players for a number of years.  Okun trained at the Israel Tennis Centers.

Early life

Okun was born in Haifa, Israel.  His parents are Igor (who works for Israeli Electric Company) and Galit (an assistant to an orthopedic doctor), and he is Jewish.

Tennis career

Okun began playing tennis at age nine, and was selected to be part of the Israeli Tennis Federation program after a short course at school.

He turned pro in 1999, at the age of 21.

In 2000, Okun qualified for the Australian Open, where he lost to hometown favorite Mark Philippoussis in a five-set thriller, 4–6, 2–6, 6–2, 6–3, 2–6. This was Okun's grand slam debut.

In March 2002, Okun upset Albert Portas of Spain, ranked # 26 in the world, 7–6(4), 6–4, in Scottsdale.  In July 2002 he upset Sjeng Schalken of the Netherlands, ranked # 23 in the world, 7–6(5), 7–6(4), in Los Angeles.  Okun qualified into the 2002 US Open, and lost to world # 1 and defending champion Lleyton Hewitt of Australia, 6–7(7), 4–6, 1–6 in the second round.

In August 2003 Okun upset Martin Verkerk of the Netherlands, ranked # 15 in the world, 3–6, 6–3, 6–1, in Cincinnati.

In August 2004, Okun won his first title in Binghamton, New York, beating Danai Udomchoke 6–3, 4–6, 6–1 for the title.

In June 2005, Okun qualified for Wimbledon, and lost to Gaël Monfils 6–3, 4–6, 4–6, 6–7(14) in the first round.  In September 2005, Okun qualified for the US Open and lost to Mariano Puerta 6–7(4), 7–6(3), 4–6, 0–6 in the first round.

In September 2006, Okun qualified for the US Open, and beat Potito Starace 6–2, 6–0, 4–6, 6–2 in the first round.  Okun went down to Łukasz Kubot in the second round, 6–7(7), 4–6, 6–2, 6–2, 4–6.

In July 2007, Okun won his second challenger title in Winnetka, Illinois, beating South Africa's Kevin Anderson 6–4, 6–3 in the final.

In February 2009 he won an Israel F2 tournament, and lost in the finals of an Israel F3 tournament to Harel Levy, by walkover. In August and September 2009, he won three tournaments -- an Israel F4, F5 and F6 tournament.

In March 2015, he played in an Israel F3 tournament in Ramat Hasharon, Israel, and lost in the finals to Isak Arvidsson of Sweden.

ATP Challenger and ITF Futures finals

Singles: 18 (10–8)

Doubles: 22 (11–11)

Performance timeline

Singles

Davis Cup

Okun was a major force on the Israeli Davis Cup team, playing for it in 1999 and since 2001, going 17–16, and winning both of his matches in Israel's 2006 3–2 victory over Great Britain. His Davis Cup record also includes big wins in live rubbers over Wayne Ferreira, Jarkko Nieminen, and Andreas Seppi.

See also
List of select Jewish tennis players

References

External links
 
 
 
 Jews in Sports bio

1978 births
Living people
Israeli male tennis players
Jewish Israeli sportspeople
Jewish tennis players
Sportspeople from Haifa